'Vijay Diwas Prathap 

Victory Day (Bangladesh), celebrated on 16 December
Vijay Diwas (India), celebrated on 16 December for the same reason as Victory Day in Bangladesh
Kargil Vijay Diwas, celebrated on 26 July in India